Deutsches Forschungsnetz ("German Research Network"), usually abbreviated to DFN, is the German national research and education network (NREN) used for academic and research purposes. It is managed by the scientific community organized in the voluntary Association to Promote a German Education and Research Network (Verein zur Förderung eines Deutschen Forschungsnetzes e.V.) which was founded in 1984 by universities, non-university research institutions and research-oriented companies to stimulate computerized communication in Germany.

DFN's "super core" backbone X-WiN network points of presence are - for example - based in Erlangen, Frankfurt, Hannover and Potsdam with more than 70 locations and can route up to 1TBit/s with over 10000 km of dedicated fibre connections.

Many connections to other networks such as GÉANT2 or DECIX are 100G-based and are implemented at the super core. Today connections up to 200GBit are possible.

Networks run by DFN e.V. 

WiN is short for Wissenschaftsnetz ("science network").

 WiN (1989–1998)
 ERWIN (1990-1992)
 B-WiN (1996-2001)
 G-WiN (Gigabit-Wissenschaftsnetz) (2000-2005)
 X-WiN (since 2006)

References

External links 
 

Education in Germany
Internet in Germany
Internet mirror services
National research and education networks
Research institutes in Germany